Ernest Mühlen (8 June 1926 – 19 March 2014) was a Luxembourgish politician for the Christian Social People's Party, economist and financial journalist. He won a place on Luxembourg City's communal council in 1973.  He was a government minister under Pierre Werner, in the early 1980s, before sitting in the European Parliament as one of Luxembourg's six MEPs from 1984 until 1989.  Mühlen followed this by sitting in the Chamber of Deputies (1989–1991), and by representing Luxembourg at the European Bank for Reconstruction and Development (1991–1996).

References

Government ministers of Luxembourg
Members of the Chamber of Deputies (Luxembourg)
Councillors in Luxembourg City
Christian Social People's Party politicians
Luxembourgian economists
Luxembourgian journalists
Male journalists
1926 births
2014 deaths
People from Ettelbruck
Commanders Crosses of the Order of Merit of the Federal Republic of Germany
MEPs for Luxembourg 1984–1989
Christian Social People's Party MEPs